Dario Alessi FRSE FRS (born in France, 1967) is a biochemist, Director of the Medical Research Council Protein Phosphorylation and Ubiquitylation Unit (MRC PPU) and Professor of Signal Transduction, at the School of Life Sciences, University of Dundee.

Education and career
He attended high school in Brussels. He graduated from the University of Birmingham, with a Bachelor of Science in biochemistry in 1988, and with a PhD in 1991, where he studied with Ian Trayer and David Trentham. His postdoctoral research was with Sir Philip Cohen FRS at the University of Dundee from 1991 to 1997. He became Professor of Signal Transduction at the University of Dundee in 2003 and Director of the MRC Protein Phosphorylation and Ubiquitylation Unit (MRC PPU) in 2012.

Research
Alessi's work is concerned with unravelling the roles of poorly characterised components which regulate protein phosphorylation or ubiquitylation that have emerged from the genetic analysis of human disease. The aim of his research is to provide new knowledge to enable researchers to devise improved strategies for the treatment of disease. Dario Alessi is also the current Director of the Division of Signal Transduction Therapy Unit (DSTT) that is a unique collaboration between University of Dundee and six major pharmaceutical companies (AstraZeneca, Boehringer Ingelheim, GlaxoSmithKline, Merck KGaA, Janssen Pharmaceutica and Pfizer) that aims to accelerate drug discovery in the areas of protein phosphorylation and ubiquitylation. As of 2013 he has written over 180 peer-reviewed papers and has been cited more than 32,000 times, making him one of the most highly cited biochemists in the world.

Awards and honours
Dario Alessi has received many awards, among these the Colworth Medal (1999), the Eppendorf Young European Investigator Award (2000), Philip Leverhulme Prize (2002), EMBO Gold Medal (2005) and the Francis Crick Prize Lecture of the Royal Society (2006). He was elected a Fellow of the Royal Society of Edinburgh in 2002, Member of the European Molecular Biology Organisation (EMBO) in 2005, Fellow of the Royal Society in 2008 and Fellow of the Academy of Medical Sciences (FMedSci) in 2012. In 2023 he was awarded the Louis-Jeantet Prize for Medicine.

References

Living people
Alumni of the University of Birmingham
Academics of the University of Dundee
Fellows of the Royal Society of Edinburgh
Fellows of the Royal Society
Fellows of the Academy of Medical Sciences (United Kingdom)
1967 births